Záluží is a municipality and village in Litoměřice District in the Ústí nad Labem Region of the Czech Republic. It has about 200 inhabitants.

Administrative parts
The village of Kozlovice is an administrative part of Záluží.

References

Villages in Litoměřice District